Forestport is a hamlet located on NY 28 in the Town of Forestport in Oneida County, New York. The Forestport Reservoir is located here and was created by the impoundment of the Black River, which flows north through the hamlet.

References

Hamlets in Oneida County, New York
Hamlets in New York (state)